20th Century Blues is a live 1996 album by English singer Marianne Faithfull, in collaboration with pianist Paul Trueblood.

Track listing

Personnel
Marianne Faithfull – vocals
Paul Trueblood – piano
Chuchow – acoustic bass
Technical
Fred Defaye, Myriam Eddaïra – engineer
Martin Böhm – mixing
Nick Knight – photography

Songs

The "Alabama Song" is from the Brecht-Weill opera The Rise and Fall of the City of Mahagonny (1930) and has been recorded by, among others, The Doors.  Faithfull would re-record the song in a year, accompanied this time by Dennis Russell Davies conducting the Vienna Radio Orchestra.
"Illusions" was originally performed by Marlene Dietrich in the Billy Wilder film A Foreign Affair (1948).
"Pirate Jenny" was introduced by Roma Bahn in the original Berlin production of The Threepenny Opera on 31 August 1928.  It has since been recorded by artists as diverse as Lotte Lenya, Nina Simone, Betty Buckley, and actress Ellen Greene.  Faithfull would re-record the song in a year, accompanied this time by Dennis Russell Davies conducting the Vienna Radio Orchestra.
Lotte Lenya's German-language recording of the "Salomon Song" (also from The Threepenny Opera) is featured on the soundtrack for the film The Savages (2007).  She was to have introduced the song in the original 1928 Berlin staging of Threepenny, however, it was cut from the show prior to opening night.  (It has subsequently been restored.)
"Boulevard of Broken Dreams" had previously been recorded by Faithfull on her 1987 album Strange Weather.
"Complainte de la Seine" is performed in the original French.
Faithfull had previously recorded "The Ballad of the Soldier's Wife" on Hal Willner's Kurt Weill tribute album Lost in the Stars: The Music of Kurt Weill (1985), as a duet with guitarist Chris Spedding.
"Mon Ami, My Friend" was first introduced by Paula Miller in the original Broadway production of Johnny Johnson, Kurt Weill's first musical written for the Broadway stage.  Miller went on to marry the musical's director, Lee Strasberg.
"Falling in Love Again" was introduced in German as "Ich bin von Kopf bis Fuß auf Liebe eingestellt" by Marlene Dietrich in Josef von Sternberg's cinematic masterpiece Der blaue Engel (1930).  It has been recorded many times, most notably by Kevin Ayers, but also Nina Simone, William S. Burroughs, Billie Holiday, and Doris Day, among others.
"Mack the Knife" is the moritat from The Threepenny Opera, where it was introduced in the original Berlin production by Kurt Gerron.  Faithfull performs it here in Irish playwright Frank McGuiness's English language translation (as she does all the Threepenny material on the album), as she had recently performed the role of Jenny in a staging of the McGuiness translation at the Gate Theatre in Dublin.  ("Mack the Knife" was, of course, famously recorded in the Marc Blitzstein translation by the likes of Bobby Darin, Louis Armstrong, and Ella Fitzgerald.)
Faithfull had first performed Coward's "20th Century Blues" in David Bowie's The 1980 Floor Show, recorded at London's Marquee Club in October 1974 for American television.
"Don't Forget Me" first appeared on the Harry Nilsson-John Lennon collaboration, Pussy Cats (1974), which was produced by Lennon during his "Lost Weekend" phase.  The song has also been covered by Joe Cocker on his album I Can Stand a Little Rain (1974) and by Tony Award nominated actress and cabaret chanteuse Sharon McNight, as well as American alt-country chanteuse Neko Case.
"Surabaya Johnny" was introduced by Carola Neher in the original Berlin production of Happy End (1929).  Faithfull sings the Michael Feingold translation, which was performed on Broadway in 1977 by Meryl Streep to co-star Christopher Lloyd.  The song has also been recorded by the likes of Bette Midler, Betty Buckley, Julie Wilson, Patti LuPone, Tim Curry, Ute Lemper, Catherine Malfitano, Anne Sofie von Otter, Gisela May, and, of course, Lotte Lenya.  Faithfull would re-record the song in a year, accompanied this time by Dennis Russell Davies conducting the Vienna Radio Orchestra.
"Street Singers Farewell" is the Frank McGuiness translation of Brecht's final verses of the moritat which were written as the ending to G.W. Pabst's film version of Die Dreigroschenoper (1931).

References

Marianne Faithfull live albums
1996 live albums
RCA Victor live albums